Rockfish is a common term for several species of fish, referring to their tendency to hide among rocks.

The name rockfish is used for many kinds of fish used for food. This common name belongs to several groups that are not closely related, and can be arbitrary.

Specific examples of fish termed rockfish include: 
The family Sebastidae, marine fishes that inhabit oceans around the world. They may be included in the family Scorpaenidae.
 Sebastes, a commercially important genus of fish in the Sebastidae inhabiting mainly the North Pacific, but with a few species in the North Atlantic and southern oceans
 Acanthoclinus, a genus of fish from New Zealand
 Bull huss or bull huss (Scyliorhinus stellaris), a shark known as rock salmon when used in cuisine
 Hexagrammos, a genus of greenling from the North Pacific
 Hypoplectrodes, a genus of fish in the family Serranidae
 Salvelinus, a genus of fish in the salmon family
 The stonefishes (genus Synanceia), venomous fishes from the Indo-Pacific
 Striped bass (Morone saxatilis), a species of fish from North America
 Groupers, fish in the subfamily Epinephelinae
 Certain fish of genus Scorpaena, such as the Madeira rockfish (S. maderensis), a common Mediterranean species
 Myliobatis goodei, which is sometimes called "rockfish"

Sources

Fish common names
Former disambiguation pages converted to set index articles